Đào Xá (chữ Hán: 陶舍 "pottery hall"), is a very common name of many villages in rural northern Vietnam. Many villages are named Dao Xa village traditional identity or the historical cultural attractions.

According to the book village name Vietnam early 19th century (in the provinces from Nghe Tinh Province back out), the early Nguyen dynasty, in the Northern and North Central Vietnam has up to 12 named Dao Xa village, including:

 Dao Xa Commune of Do Xa District Government Upper Hong Hao Hai Duong Town (Dao Xa, My Hao, Hung Yen)
 Dao Xa Commune District Department of An Phu Ngoc Thuong Hong, Hai Duong Town (Dao Xa, Binh Giang, Hai Duong)
 Dao Xa Commune of Ha Bi Government Quang Oai District Real baht Shanxi Town (now the Dao Xa village, Dao Xa Commune, Thanh Thuy, Phu Tho)
 Dao Xa Commune of Government Finance Bankruptcy Lang Lang to Thuan An district of origin Kinh Bac (Dao Xa Luong Tai, Bac Ninh)
 Dao Xa Commune Yen Phong district of La Huong Son Made in India from Kinh Bac (Dao Xa, Bac Ninh city)
 Dao Xa Commune of Hong Nhan Vu Hung Minister Tien Hung District Town Son Nam Ha (Dao Xa, Hung Ha, Thai Binh)
 Dao Xa Commune of Dong Vi Dong Phu Thai Binh Town Son Nam Ha (Dao Xa, Dong Hung, Thai Binh)
 Dao Xa Commune of Phu Duc Dao Xa Pacific Town Government Son Nam Ha (Dao Xa, Quynh Phu, Thai Binh)
 Dao Xa commune of Ta Xa Minister Kim Dong Khoai Chau Town Son Nam Thuong (Dao Xa, Khoai Chau, Hung Yen)
 Dao Xa Commune of Dong An Luu Xa Government Khoai Chau Town Son Nam Thuong (Dao Xa, Phu Xuyen, Ha Noi)
 Dao Xa village of Dong Lu district government application Thien Minh Son Tran Son Nam Thuong (Dao Xa, Ung Hoa, Ha Noi)
 Dao Xa village of Thuong Dinh District From Agriculture Minister Nguyen Phu Binh Thai origin (now the Dao Xa Commune, Phu Binh, Thai Nguyen).

In addition in the district towns of Son Nam Ha, there is a general (administrative level between communes and districts, today no longer exists) is also named Dao Xa. Many Dao Xa village today developed into the Dao Xa Commune, Phu Binh district as Dao Xa or Xa Dao Thanh Thuy.

References

Populated places in Vietnam